Waldemar Piotr Słomiany (born 1 November 1943 in Bielszowice, now Ruda Śląska) is a retired Polish football defender. Słomiany spent the most successful years of his career at Górnik Zabrze, winning several championships of Poland in the 1960s. He capped was once for Poland, on 16 October 1963, in a 1–3 loss to Greece.

Słomiany started his career in a local club Wawel Wirek, and in 1962 he moved to Górnik Zabrze, in which he played in 93 games, scoring 4 goals. In 1967, he illegally decided to stay in Western Germany. He played for Bundesliga teams such as FC Schalke 04, and Arminia Bielefeld. In 1971, he was among players involved in corruption scandal (known in Germany as Bundesligaskandal), which resulted in his suspension and after that he did not resume playing. Altogether, Słomiany played 98 games in the Bundesliga, scoring 11 goals.

References

1943 births
Sportspeople from Ruda Śląska
People from the Province of Upper Silesia
Polish footballers
Poland international footballers
Górnik Zabrze players
FC Schalke 04 players
Arminia Bielefeld players
Bundesliga players
Living people
Association football defenders